Thomas Östlund, born September 9, 1965, is a Swedish former ice hockey goaltender. He was nicknamed "Osten".

Östlund was selected to the 1994-95 Elitserien All-Star Team, and was named the 1997-98 National League A Goaltender of the Year.

In March 2002, he announced his retirement following the 2001–2002 season.

References

1965 births
Living people
AIK IF players
Djurgårdens IF Hockey players
Swedish ice hockey goaltenders
Ice hockey people from Stockholm